George Edward Coleman (born March 8, 1935) is an American jazz saxophonist known for his work with Miles Davis and Herbie Hancock in the 1960s. In 2015, he was named an NEA Jazz Master.

Early life
Coleman was born in Memphis, Tennessee. He was taught how to play the alto saxophone in his teens by his older brother Lucian Adams, inspired (like many jazz musicians of his generation) by Charlie Parker. Among his schoolmates were Harold Mabern, Booker Little, Frank Strozier, Hank Crawford, and Charles Lloyd.

Later life and career

After working with Ray Charles, Coleman started working with B.B. King in 1953, at which point he switched to tenor saxophone. In 1956 Coleman moved to Chicago, along with Booker Little, where he worked with Gene Ammons and Johnny Griffin before joining Max Roach's quintet (1958–1959). Coleman recorded with organist Jimmy Smith on his album House Party (1957), along with Lee Morgan, Curtis Fuller, Kenny Burrell, and Donald Bailey. Moving to New York City with Max Roach in that year, he went on to play with Slide Hampton (1959–1962), Ron Carter, Jimmy Cobb, and Wild Bill Davis (1962), before joining Miles Davis' quintet in 1963–1964.

His albums with Davis (and the rhythm section of Herbie Hancock (piano), Ron Carter (bass), and Tony Williams (drums)) are Seven Steps to Heaven (1963), A Rare Home Town Appearance (1963), Côte Blues (1963), In Europe (1963), My Funny Valentine, and Four & More, both live recordings of a concert in Lincoln Center for the Performing Arts in New York City in February 1964. Shortly after this concert, Coleman was replaced by Wayne Shorter. Nevertheless, Davis retained a high opinion of Coleman's playing, stating that "George played everything almost perfectly...He was a hell of a musician." Coleman played with Lionel Hampton (1965–1966), also in 1965 on Chet Baker's The Prestige Sessions, with Kirk Lightsey, Herman Wright, and Roy Brooks. Clark Terry, Horace Silver, Elvin Jones (1968), Shirley Scott (1972), Cedar Walton (1975), Charles Mingus (1977–1978), Ahmad Jamal (1994, 2000), and many others.

Coleman also appeared in the science-fiction film Freejack (1992), starring Emilio Estevez, Mick Jagger, and Anthony Hopkins; and 1996's The Preacher's Wife, with Denzel Washington and Whitney Houston.

Coleman recorded into the 2000s. His CD as co-leader, Four Generations of Miles: A Live Tribute To Miles, with bassist Ron Carter, drummer Jimmy Cobb and guitarist Mike Stern was released on Chesky Records in October 2002, and it concentrates on the 1960s working repertoire of Miles Davis. Tracks include: "There Is No Greater Love", "All Blues", "On Green Dolphin Street", "Blue in Green", "81", "Freddie Freeloader", "My Funny Valentine", "If I Were a Bell", and "Oleo". He was featured on Joey DeFrancesco's 2006 release Organic Vibes, along with vibraphonist Bobby Hutcherson, Billboard's Top Jazz Album Chart, peaked to No. 17.

Coleman was married to jazz organist Gloria Coleman. They had two children, including jazz drummer George Coleman Jr., and divorced.

He was named an NEA Jazz Master and to the Memphis Music Hall of Fame in 2015, and received a brass note on the Beale Street Brass Notes Walk of Fame.

Discography

As leader/co-leader

As sideman
With Chet Baker
Smokin' with the Chet Baker Quintet (Prestige, 1965)
Groovin' with the Chet Baker Quintet (Prestige, 1965)
Comin' On with the Chet Baker Quintet (Prestige, 1965)
Cool Burnin' with the Chet Baker Quintet (Prestige, 1965)
Boppin' with the Chet Baker Quintet (Prestige, 1965)
With Roy Brooks
The Free Slave [live] (Muse, 1970 [rel. 1972])
With Paul (PB) Brown
Paul Brown Quartet Meets The Three Tenors (Brownstone, 1998)
With Brian Charette
Groovin' with Big G (Steeplechase, 2018) – with Vic Juris, George Coleman Jr.
With Miles Davis
Seven Steps to Heaven (Columbia, 1963)
Miles Davis in Europe [live] (Columbia, 1963)
Live at the 1963 Monterey Jazz Festival [live] (Monterey Jazz Festival Records, 2007)
My Funny Valentine [live] (Columbia, 1964)
Four & More [live] (Columbia, 1964 [rel. 1966])
With Joey DeFrancesco
Organic Vibes (Concord, 2005)
With Charles Earland
Soul Crib (Choice, 1969)
Smokin' (Muse, 1969/1977 [rel. 1977])
Mama Roots (Muse, 1969/1977 [rel. 1977])
With Red Garland
So Long Blues (Galaxy, 1979 [rel. 1981])
Strike Up the Band (Galaxy, 1979 [rel. 1981])
With Slide Hampton
Slide Hampton and His Horn of Plenty (Strand, 1959)
Sister Salvation (Atlantic, 1960)
 Somethin' Sanctified (Atlantic, 1961)
 Jazz with a Twist (Atlantic, 1962)
Drum Suite (Epic, 1962)
Exodus (Philips, 1962 [rel. 1964])
With Herbie Hancock
 Maiden Voyage (Blue Note, 1965)
With Johnny Hartman
 Today (Perception, 1972)
With Ahmad Jamal
The Essence Part One (Birdology/Verve, 1995)
 Ahmad Jamal à l'Olympia [live] (Dreyfus, 2000)
With Elvin Jones
Live at the Village Vanguard (Enja, 1968)
 Poly-Currents (Blue Note, 1969)
 Coalition (Blue Note, 1970)
Time Capsule (Vanguard, 1977)
With Booker Little
Booker Little 4 and Max Roach (United Artists 1957)
Booker Little and Friend (Bethlehem, 1961)
With Harold Mabern
A Few Miles from Memphis (Prestige, 1968)
Rakin' and Scrapin' (Prestige, 1968)
Workin' & Wailin' (Prestige, 1969)
With Jack McDuff
A Change Is Gonna Come (Atlantic, 1966)
With Charles Mingus
 Three or Four Shades of Blues (Atlantic, 1977)
With Lee Morgan
 City Lights (Blue Note, 1957)
 Sonic Boom (Blue Note, 1966)
With Idris Muhammad
Kabsha (Theresa, 1980)
With Don Patterson
Oh Happy Day (Prestige, 1969) – reissued on CD as Dem New York Dues
Tune Up! (Prestige, 1969)
With John Patton
Memphis to New York Spirit (Blue Note, 1969)
With Nicholas Payton

 Smoke Sessions (Smoke Sessions Records, 2021)

With  Duke Pearson
 Honeybuns (Atlantic, 1965)
  Prairie Dog (Atlantic, 1966)
With Max Roach
The Max Roach 4 Plays Charlie Parker (Emarcy, 1958)
 Max Roach + 4 on the Chicago Scene (Emarcy, 1958)
 Max Roach + 4 at Newport (Emarcy, 1958)
Deeds, Not Words (Riverside, 1958)
 Award-Winning Drummer (Time, 1958)
 The Many Sides of Max (Mercury, 1959)
With Shirley Scott
Lean on Me (Cadet, 1972)
With Jimmy Smith
 House Party (Blue Note, 1957–58)
The Sermon! (Blue Note, 1958)
 With Louis Smith
Just Friends (Steeplechase, 1982)
With Melvin Sparks
Akilah! (Prestige, 1972)
With Charles Tolliver
Impact (Strata-East, 1975)
With Roseanna Vitro
Reaching for the Moon (Chase Music Group, 1991)
Softly (Concord, 1993)
With Mal Waldron
Sweet Love, Bitter (Impulse!, 1967)
With Cedar Walton
Eastern Rebellion (Timeless, 1975) – with Sam Jones, Billy Higgins
With Reuben Wilson
 Love Bug (Blue Note, 1969)

References

External links 
 
 George Coleman as Sideman

1935 births
Living people
Hard bop saxophonists
Mainstream jazz saxophonists
American jazz saxophonists
American male saxophonists
African-American jazz musicians
African-American saxophonists
Miles Davis Quintet members
Musicians from Memphis, Tennessee
21st-century saxophonists
American male jazz musicians
Smoke Sessions Records artists